Protestants are a minority of less than 2% of the population of Pakistan. In the 1990s Christians were imprisoned on blasphemy charges. There is an endeavour by some Muslims to convert Christians. In 2005 schools and churches were burned in an anti-Christian riot in the major city of Faisalabad.

There have been a number of attacks on Pakistani Christians by Islamists in recent years.

History 

In colonial India, the All India Conference of Indian Christians (AICIC) played an important role in the Indian independence movement, advocating for swaraj and opposing the partition of India. The AICIC also was opposed to separate electorates for Christians, believing that the faithful "should participate as common citizens in one common, national political system". The meeting of the All India Conference of Indian Christians in Lahore in December 1922, which had a large attendance of Punjabis, resolved that the clergymen of the Church in India should be drawn from the ranks of Indians, rather than foreigners. The AICIC also stated that Indian Christians would not tolerate any discrimination based on race or skin colour. S. K. Datta of Lahore, who served as the principal of Forman Christian College, became the president of the All India Conference of Indian Christians, representing the Indian Christian community at the Second Round Table Conference, where he agreed with Mahatma Gandhi's views on minorities and Depressed Classes. The All India Conference of Indian Christians and the All India Catholic Union formed a working committee with M. Rahnasamy of Andhra University serving as President and B.L. Rallia Ram of Lahore serving as General Secretary; in its meeting on 16 April 1947 and 17 April 1947, the joint committee prepared a 13 point memorandum that was sent to the Constituent Assembly of India, which asked for religious freedom for both organisations and individuals; this came to be reflected in the Constitution of India.

List of Christian denominations 
Church of Pakistan
Presbyterian Church of Pakistan
Associate Reformed Presbyterian Church in Pakistan
United Presbyterian Church of Pakistan (formerly known as Siloam Biblical Christian Church of Pakistan)

See also 
New Apostolic Church

References 

 
Pakistan